Golica TV is Slovenian local television station. Golica is leading folk music in Slovenian broadcasting market. The station offers a large compilation of folk music videos, entertainment live shows, live broadcasts and shopping network.

TV shows
 Gospodinje pojejo (Housewives sing)
 Z Golico na vas (With Golica to the countryside)
 Jutro z Pečom in Rezo (Morning with Pečo and Reza)
 Opoldne z Mino Pal (At noon with Mina Pal)
 Popoldne z Jasmino (Afternoon with Jasmina)
 Vikend z Mojco (Weekend with Mojca)
 Golica v zivo (Golica live)
 Odpelji Škodo (Take Škoda)

TV shows of the past
 Pod židano marelo
 Golica Naj naj
 Glasbeni kviz (Music quiz)
 Vislice (Gallows)
 Iz domače skrinje (From our chests)

TV hosts
Špela Grošelj
Mama Manka
Katarina Jurkovič
Karmen Klinc
Maja Oderlap
Jasmina Kandorfer Čekeliš
Žiga Kršinar
Domen Hren
Robert Pečnik - Pečo
Alenka Oldroyd - Reza
Mina Pal

References

Television channels in Slovenia
Television channels and stations established in 1995